Nassarius, common name nassa mud snails (USA) or dog whelks (UK), is a genus of minute to medium-sized sea snails, marine gastropod molluscs in the family Nassariidae. They are scavengers.

Etymology
The name is derived from the Latin word "nassa", meaning a wickerbasket with a narrow neck, for catching fish. Nassarius would then mean "someone who uses such a wickerbasket for catching fish".

Ecology

Distribution and habitat
Species within this genus are found worldwide. These snails usually live on mud flats or sand flats, intertidally or subtidally.

Life habits
Most Nassarius species are very active scavengers, feeding on crabs and carrion as dead fish, etc. They often burrow into marine substrates and then wait with only their siphon protruding, until they smell nearby food.

Shell description
The shells of species in this genus have a relatively high cyrtoconoid (approaching a conical shape but with convex sides) spire and a siphonal notch.

Anatomy
The animal has a long siphon.

Human use

Archeology
Several beads made from Nassarius gibbosulus shells are thought to be the earliest known forms of personal adornment, or even jewelry. Two shell beads found in Skhul Cave on the slopes of Mount Carmel, Israel, are thought to be 100,000 years old, whilst another found at Oued Djebbana, Algeria, is believed to be 90,000 years old. A further group of pierced shells, some with red ochre, has been recovered from the Aterian levels at the Taforalt site in Morocco; these Nassarius gibbosulus beads have been securely dated to about 82,000 years ago.

All these examples predate several 75,000-year-old Nassarius kraussianus beads which were found at Blombos Cave, South Africa (including some colored with red ochre). These beads had previously been thought to be the oldest examples of jewelry.

From A.D. 1130 to 1275, shell beads were manufactured by the inhabitants of the Exhausted Cave near the Clear Creek Ruins. A Southern Sinagua site in Verde Valley, Arizona where "shell played a major role in the economic system of this culture."

Modern uses
Nassarius vibex is a species which is often selected for marine aquaria. It is often confused with Nassarius obsoletus, a cooler water snail less suited to tropical marine aquarium temperatures. In aquaria, the Nassarius is considered nearly indispensable for keeping sand beds clean and healthy, as these snails tend to burrow and plow through the upper layer in a conch-like fashion, keeping algae and detritus from building up visibly on the surface.

The shells of various species of Nassarius are popular with shell collectors, and are sometimes used in jewelry and other forms of decoration.

Taxonomy
The genus Nassarius has traditionally been subdivided into several subgenera, based on differences in shell morphology, especially the sculpture: Aciculina, Alectrion, Allanassa, Nassodonta, Niotha, Plicarcularia, Profundinassa, Pygmaeonassa, Telasco, and Zeuxis. However, this division is difficult to define, resulting in much confusion. Even phylogenetic analysis shows that the division into these subgenera appears to be uncertain and unreliable. There seem to be two groups within the genus Nassarius with the closest relationship between the subgenera Zeuxis and Telasco. Even the species within the subgenus Plicarcularia do not belong to a single clade. In the end, the molecular phylogeny did not match the previous morphological phylogeny.

Gallery

Species
In the course of time, more than 1,000 names have been allocated to species in the genus Nassarius, most of which have become synonyms.

The following species are accepted names according to the World Register of Marine Species (WoRMS):

 Nassarius absconditus Gili, 2015
 Nassarius abyssicolus (A. Adams, 1852)
 Nassarius acteon MacNeil, 1960
 Nassarius acuminatus (Marrat, 1880)
 Nassarius acuticostus (Montrouzier in Souverbie & Montrouzier, 1864)
 Nassarius acutus (Say, 1822)
 † Nassarius adae (Boettger, 1902) 
 Nassarius adami Arthur & Fernandes, 1989
 Nassarius agapetus (Watson, 1882)
 †Nassarius agatensis (Bellardi, 1882) 
  Nassarius alabasteroides Kool, 2009
 Nassarius albescens (Dunker, 1846)
 Nassarius albinus (Thiele, 1930)
 Nassarius albomaculatus Rehder, 1980
 †Nassarius alfuricus (Fischer in Wanner, 1927)
 Nassarius algidus (Reeve, 1853)
 † Nassarius amycliformis (Shuto, 1969)
 Nassarius angolensis (Odhner, 1923)
 † Nassarius angulatus (Brocchi, 1814) 
 Nassarius anguliferus (A. Adams, 1852)
 † Nassarius anomalus (Harmer, 1914) 
 † Nassarius antiquus (Bellardi, 1882) 
 Nassarius aoteanus Finlay, 1926
 Nassarius arcadioi Rolán & Hernández, 2005
 Nassarius arcularia (Linnaeus, 1758)
 Nassarius arcus Cernohorsky, 1991
 Nassarius arewarensis Nerurkar, Shimpi & Apte, 2020
 Nassarius argenteus (Marrat, 1877)
 † Nassarius asperulus (Brocchi, 1814) 
 Nassarius atlantideus Adam & Knudsen, 1984
 † Nassarius attiguus (Bellardi, 1882) 
 Nassarius babylonicus (Watson, 1882)
 † Nassarius badensis (Hörnes, 1852) 
 Nassarius bailyi (Pilsbry & Lowe, 1932)
 † Nassarius banaticus (Boettger, 1902) 
 † Nassarius bantamensis Oostingh, 1933
 † Nassarius barbarossai Landau, Harzhauser, İslamoğlu & Silva, 2013 
 Nassarius barsdelli Ladd, 1976
 † Nassarius beberkirianus (K. Martin & Icke, 1906)
 Nassarius bellulus (A. Adams, 1852)
 Nassarius bellus (Marrat, 1877)
 Nassarius berniceae Willan & Beechey, 2015
 † Nassarius beureumensis Oostingh, 1933
 Nassarius bicallosus (E.A. Smith, 1876)
 Nassarius biendongensis Kool, 2003
 Nassarius bifarius W. Baird, 1873
 Nassarius bimaculosus (A. Adams, 1852)
 † Nassarius bolangoi (Ladd, 1976)
 † Nassarius bonellii (Sismonda, 1847) 
 Nassarius boucheti Kool, 2004
 Nassarius bourbonensis Kool, 2015
 † Nassarius brebioni Van Dingenen, Ceulemans, Landau & C. M. Silva, 2015 
 Nassarius brunneostomus (Stearns, 1893)
 Nassarius bruuni Adam & Knudsen, 1984
 Nassarius cadeei Kool, 2006
 Nassarius caelatus (A. Adams, 1852)
 Nassarius caelolineatus Nesbitt & Pitt, 1986
 Nassarius callospira (A. Adams, 1852)
  † Nassarius caloosaensis (Dall, 1890)
 Nassarius camelus (von Martens, 1897)
 Nassarius candei (d'Orbigny, 1847)
 Nassarius candens (Hinds, 1844)
 † Nassarius cantauranus Landau, 2010 
 Nassarius capensis (Dunker, 1846)
 Nassarius capillaris (Watson, 1882)
 Nassarius castus (Gould, 1835)
 Nassarius catallus (Dall, 1908)
 † Nassarius cautleyi (d'Archiac & Haime)
 Nassarius celebensis (Schepman, 1907)
 † Nassarius cerithiformis (Hilber, 1879) 
 Nassarius cernohorskyi Kool, 2005
 Nassarius cerritensis (Arnold, 1903)
 Nassarius chibi (Habe, 1960)
 † Nassarius chiereghinii (Bellardi, 1882) 
 Nassarius cinctellus (Gould, 1850)
 Nassarius cinctellus (A. Adams, 1852) (invalid as a junior homonym, but temporarily retained)
 Nassarius cinnamomeus (A. Adams, 1852)
 Nassarius circumcinctus (Adams A., 1852)
 Nassarius clarus (Marrat, 1877)
  † Nassarius clathratus (Born, 1778)
 Nassarius collarius (C. B. Adams, 1852)
 † Nassarius coloratus (Eichwald, 1830) 
 † Nassarius columbinus Van Dingenen, Ceulemans, Landau & C. M. Silva, 2015 
 † Nassarius companyoi (Fontannes, 1879) 
 Nassarius compertus Fernández-Garcés, Espinosa & Rolán, 1990
 Nassarius comptus (Marrat, 1880)
 Nassarius comptus polita (Marrat, 1880)
 Nassarius concinnus (Powys, 1835)
 Nassarius congrua (Yokoyama, 1926)
 Nassarius conoidalis (Deshayes, 1832)
 Nassarius consensus (Ravenel, 1861) - striate nassa
 Nassarius coppingeri (E.A. Smith, 1881)
 Nassarius coriolis Kool, 2009
 Nassarius coronatus (Bruguière, 1789)
 Nassarius coronulus (A. Adams, 1852)
 † Nassarius corrugatus (Brocchi, 1814) 
 † Nassarius crassigranosus (Tate, 1888) 
 † Nassarius crassiusculus (Nyst, 1845)
 † Nassarius crebresulcatus (Bellardi, 1882) 
 Nassarius crebricostatus (Schepman, 1911)
 Nassarius crematus (Hinds, 1844)
 Nassarius crenoliratus (A. Adams, 1852)
 Nassarius crenulatus (Lamarck, 1816) (nomen dubium)
 † Nassarius daciae (Hoernes & Auinger, 1882) 
 Nassarius dakarensis (Fischer-Piette & Nicklès, 1946)
 Nassarius dekkeri Kool, 2001
 Nassarius delicatus (A. Adams, 1852)
 Nassarius delosi (Woodring, 1946)
 † Nassarius demissus (Yokoyama, 1923)
 † Nassarius denselineatus (Nagao, 1928)
 Nassarius dentifer (Powys, 1835)
 Nassarius deshayesianus (Issel, 1866)
 Nassarius deshayesii (Hombron & Jacquinot, 1848)
 Nassarius desmoulioides (G.B. Sowerby III, 1903)
 Nassarius dijki (K. Martin, 1895)
 Nassarius dilutus (E.A. Smith, 1899)
 Nassarius dimorphoides Oostingh, 1935
 Nassarius disparilis (E.A. Smith, 1903)
 Nassarius distortus (A. Adams, 1852)
 † Nassarius doliolum (Eichwald, 1830) 
 Nassarius dorri Wattebled, 1886
 Nassarius dorsatus (Röding, 1798)
 Nassarius dorsuosus (A. Adams, 1852)
 † Nassarius dujardini (Deshayes, 1844) 
 Nassarius echinatus (A. Adams, 1852)
 Nassarius ecstilbus (Melvill & Standen, 1896)
 † Nassarius edlaueri (Beer-Bistrický, 1958) 
 † Nassarius eichwaldi (Friedberg, 1911) 
 † Nassarius elabratus (Doderlein, 1862) 
 Nassarius elegantissimus Shuto, 1969
 Nassarius emilyae Moolenbeek & Dekker, 1994
 † Nassarius eniwetokensis Ladd, 1977
  Nassarius enzoi Bozzetti, 2007
 † Nassarius erentoezae Landau, Harzhauser, İslamoğlu & Silva, 2013 
 † Nassarius erunalae Landau, Harzhauser, İslamoğlu & Silva, 2013 
 Nassarius euglyptus (G. B. Sowerby III, 1914)
 Nassarius eusulcatus (Sowerby, 1902)
 Nassarius excellens (Kuroda & Habe, 1961)
 Nassarius exilis (Powys, 1835)
 Nassarius eximius (H. Adams, 1872)
 Nassarius exsarcus (Dall, 1908)
 † Nassarius exspectatus (Bałuk, 1997) 
 † Nassarius exstincteliratus (Fischer in Wanner, 1927)
 Nassarius exulatus (E.A. Smith, 1911)
 † Nassarius falconeri (d'Archiac & Haime, 1854)
 Nassarius fenistratus (Marratt, 1877)
 † Nassarius fennemai Oostingh, 1939
 Nassarius fenwicki Kilburn, 1972
 † Nassarius ficaratiensis (Monterosato, 1891) 
 Nassarius fidus (Reeve, 1853)
 Nassarius filmerae (G.B. Sowerby III, 1900)
 Nassarius filosus (Reeve, 1853)
 Nassarius fissilabris (Adams, A., 1852)
 Nassarius formosus (Turton, 1932)
 Nassarius fossae (Preston, 1915)
 Nassarius fossatus (Gould, 1850) - channeled nassa
 Nassarius foveolatus (Dunker, 1847)
 Nassarius fraterculus (Dunker, 1860) - Japanese nassa
 Nassarius fraudator Cernohorsky, 1980
 Nassarius fraudulentus (Marrat, 1877)
 Nassarius frederici (Melvill & Standen, 1901)
 Nassarius fretorum (Melvill & Standen, 1899)
 † Nassarius fritzsteiningeri Harzhauser & Cernohorsky, 2011 
 † Nassarius fuchsi (Koenen, 1872) 
 Nassarius fufanus (Fischer in Wanner, 1927)
 Nassarius fuscescens (Dautzenberg, 1912)
 Nassarius fuscolineatus (E.A. Smith, 1875)
 Nassarius fuscus (Hombron & Jacquinot, 1848)
 Nassarius gallegosi Strong and Hertlein, 1937
 Nassarius garuda Kool, 2007
 Nassarius gaudiosus (Hinds, 1844)
 Nassarius gaudiosus marrati E.A. Smith, 1876
 Nassarius gaudiosus mucronata (A.. Adams, 1851)
 Nassarius gayii (Kiener, 1834)
 Nassarius gemmuliferus A. Adams, 1852
  Nassarius gemmulosus (C.B. Adams, 1852)
 † Nassarius gendryi Van Dingenen, Ceulemans, Landau & C. M. Silva, 2015 
 † Nassarius gigantulus (Michelotti, 1840) †
 † Nassarius gilii Landau, Harzhauser, İslamoğlu & Silva, 2013 
 Nassarius glabrus J.-L. Zhang & S.-P. Zhang, 2014
 Nassarius glagahensis Oostingh, 1935
 Nassarius glans (Linnaeus, 1758)
 Nassarius glans particeps (Hedley, 1915)
 Nassarius globosus (Quoy & Gaimard, 1833)
 Nassarius goniopleura (Dall, 1908): taxon inquirendum
 † Nassarius grammatus (Dall, 1917) 
 Nassarius granifer Kiener, 1834
 Nassarius granosocostatus (Schepman, 1911)
 Nassarius graphiterus (Hombron & Jacquinot, 1848)
 † Nassarius grateloupi (Hörnes, 1852) 
 Nassarius gruneri (Dunker, 1846)
 Nassarius gruveli Adam & Knudsen, 1984
 Nassarius guaymasensis (Pilsbry & Lowe, 1932)
 Nassarius haldemanni (Dunker, 1847)
 Nassarius hansenae Kool, 1996
 Nassarius harpularia (Marrat, 1877)
 Nassarius harryleei García, 2001
 Nassarius helleri (Mari, 1929)
 † Nassarius hemipolitus Nomura & Zimbo, 1935
 Nassarius hepaticus (Pulteney, 1799)
 Nassarius herosae Kool, 2005
 Nassarius himeroessa (Melvill & Standen, 1903)
 Nassarius hiradoensis (Pilsbry, 1904)
 Nassarius hirasei Kuroda & Habe, 1952 
 Nassarius hirtus (Kiener, 1834)
 † Nassarius hochstetteri (Hoernes & Auinger, 1882) 
 Nassarius hongoensis Itoigawa, 1955
 Nassarius horridus (Dunker, 1847)
 Nassarius houbricki Kool & Galindo, 2014
 Nassarius howardae Chace, 1958
 Nassarius hugokooli Thach, 2016
 Nassarius humeratus J.-W. Yang & S.-P. Zhang, 2011
 † Nassarius hungaricus (Mayer, 1873) 
 † Nassarius iberoclathratus Landau, C. M. Silva & Gili, 2009 
 Nassarius idyllius (Melvill & Standen, 1901)
 Nassarius ikedai Thach, 2017
 † Nassarius illovensis (Hoernes & Auinger, 1882) 
 † Nassarius incognitus (Peyrot, 1925) 
 Nassarius incongruus Otuka, 1937
 † Nassarius infralaevis (Fischer in Wanner, 1927)
 Nassarius insculptus (Carpenter, 1864) - smooth western nassa
 Nassarius interliratus (E. A. Smith, 1876)
 † Nassarius intersulcatus (Hilber, 1879) 
 Nassarius iodes (Dall, 1917)
 Nassarius irus (Martens, 1880)
 Nassarius ischnus (Melvill, 1899)
 Nassarius jacksonianus (Quoy & Gaimard, 1833)
 Nassarius jactabundus (Melvill, 1906)
 † Nassarius janschloegli Harzhauser, 2011 
 † Nassarius jansseni Harzhauser & Kowalke, 2004 
 Nassarius javanus (Schepman, 1891)
 Nassarius jonasii (Dunker, 1846)
  † Nassarius junghuhni (K. Martin, 1895)
 Nassarius kaicherae Jong & Coomans, 1988
 Nassarius keenii (Marrat, 1877)
 Nassarius kiiensis Kira, 1954
 Nassarius kilburni Kool, 2019
 Nassarius kochianus (Dunker, 1846)
 Nassarius kometubus Otuka, 1934
 † Nassarius kondangensis (Oostingh, 1939) 
 Nassarius kooli Dekker & Dekkers, 2009
 Nassarius kraussianus (Dunker, 1846)
 Nassarius kruizingai Oostingh, 1939
 Nassarius labiatus (A. Adams, 1853)
 † Nassarius labiosus (J. de C. Sowerby, 1824) 
 Nassarius labordei (Giner Mari, 1929)
 † Nassarius landreauensis Van Dingenen, Ceulemans, Landau & C. M. Silva, 2015 
 † Nassarius lapugyensis (Hoernes & Auinger, 1882) 
 † Nassarius larandicus Landau, Harzhauser, İslamoğlu & Silva, 2013 
 Nassarius lavanonoensis Bozzetti, 2006
 Nassarius lawsonorum Kilburn, 2000
 Nassarius leptospira (A. Adams, 1852)
 Nassarius levis Abbate & Cavallari, 2013
 Nassarius liberiensis (Knudsen, 1956)
 † Nassarius ligusticus (Bellardi, 1882) 
 Nassarius limacinus (Dall, 1917)
 Nassarius limnaeformis (Dunker, 1847)
 Nassarius livescens (Philippi, 1848)
 Nassarius lochi Kool, 1996
 Nassarius luctuosus (A. Adams, 1852)
  Nassarius luridus (Gould, 1850)
 Nassarius maccauslandi Cernohorsky, 1984
 Nassarius macrocephalus  (Schepman, 1911)
 † Nassarius macrodon (Bronn, 1831) 
 † Nassarius madiunensis (K. Martin, 1895)
 Nassarius madurensis Kool, 2013
 Nassarius mammilliferus (Melvill, 1897)
 † Nassarius mandirensis Oostingh, 1939
 † Nassarius mangkalihatensis Beets, 1941
 Nassarius margaritifer (Dunker, 1847)
 Nassarius marmoreus (A. Adams, 1852)
 Nassarius marratii (E. A. Smith, 1876)
 † Nassarius martae Van Dingenen, Ceulemans, Landau & C. M. Silva, 2015 
 † Nassarius martinelli Gili, 1992 
 Nassarius martinezi Kool & Galindo, 2014
 Nassarius massemini Kool, 2020
 Nassarius maxuitongi S.-Q. Zhang, S.-P. Zhang & H.-T. Li, 2019
 Nassarius megalocallus Adam & Knudsen, 1984
 † Nassarius megastoma (Bellardi, 1882) 
 Nassarius mekranicus (Vredenburg, 1925)
 Nassarius mendicus (Gould, 1850) - lean western nassa
 † Nassarius merlei Van Dingenen, Ceulemans, Landau & C. M. Silva, 2015 
 Nassarius micans (A. Adams, 1852)
 Nassarius mirabilis Bozzetti, 2007
 Nassarius miser (Dall, 1908)
 Nassarius mobilis (Hedley & May, 1908)
 Nassarius moestus (Hinds, 1844)
 Nassarius moolenbeeki Kool, 1995
 Nassarius muelleri (Maltzan, 1884)
 Nassarius multicostatus (A. Adams, 1852)
 Nassarius multigranosus (Dunker, 1847)
 Nassarius multipunctatus (Schepman, 1911)
 Nassarius multivocus Kool, 2008
 Nassarius mundus (Sturany, 1900)
 Nassarius mustelina (Gould, 1860)
 Nassarius myristicatus (Hinds, 1844)
 Nassarius nakayamai (Habe, 1958)
 Nassarius nanhaiensis Zhang, 2013
 Nassarius natalensis (E.A. Smith, 1903)
 † Nassarius neugeboreni (Hoernes & Auinger, 1882) 
 Nassarius ngawianus (K. Martin, 1895)
 Nassarius ngocthachi Cossignani, 2021
 Nassarius nigellus (Reeve, 1854)
 Nassarius niger (Hombron & Jacquinot, 1848)
 Nassarius nigrolabrus (Verrill, 1880) (nomen dubium)
 Nassarius niveus (A. Adams, 1852)
 Nassarius nobilis (Thiele, 1925)
 Nassarius nodicinctus (A. Adams, 1852)
 Nassarius nodicostatus (A. Adams, 1852)
 Nassarius nodiferus (Powys, 1835)
 Nassarius nodulosus (Marrat, 1873)
 Nassarius noguchii (Habe, 1958)
 Nassarius notoensis Masuda, 1956
 † Nassarius notterbecki (Hoernes & Auinger, 1882) 
 Nassarius novaezelandiae (Reeve, 1854)
 Nassarius nuceus (Pease, 1869)
 Nassarius nucleolus (Philippi, 1846)
 † Nassarius nuttalli (Ludbrook, 1978) 
 Nassarius oberwimmeri (Preston, 1907)
 Nassarius obesus (G. & H. Nevill, 1875)
 Nassarius oblongus (Marrat, 1877)
 Nassarius obvelatus (Deshayes, 1833)
 Nassarius ocellatus Kool & Galindo, 2014
 Nassarius ofeliae Cossignani, 2021
 Nassarius olivaceus (Bruguière, 1789)
 Nassarius olomea Kay, 1979
 † Nassarius omuensis (H. Noda, 1980) 
 Nassarius onchodes (Dall, 1917)
 Nassarius oneratus (Deshayes, 1863)
 Nassarius optimus (G.B. Sowerby III, 1903)
 Nassarius orissaensis (Preston, 1914)
 † Nassarius ovum K. Martin, 1880
 † Nassarius pacaudi Van Dingenen, Ceulemans, Landau & C. M. Silva, 2015 
 Nassarius pachychilus (von Maltzan, 1884)
 † Nassarius palumbis Van Dingenen, Ceulemans, Landau & C. M. Silva, 2015 
 Nassarius paolomeli T. Cossignani, 2018
 Nassarius papillosus (Gould, 1850)
 Nassarius parcipictus Adam & Knudsen, 1984
 † Nassarius pascaleae Landau, Harzhauser, İslamoğlu & Silva, 2013 
 † Nassarius patnuttalli Landau, C. M. Silva & Gili, 2009 
 Nassarius patricius (Thiele, 1925)
 Nassarius paucicostatus (Marrat, 1877)
 † Nassarius pauli (Hoernes, 1875) 
 Nassarius pauperatus (Lamarck, 1822)
 † Nassarius perdominulus Nomura & Zimbo, 1935
 Nassarius pernitidus (Dall, 1889)
 Nassarius persicus (von Martens, 1874)
 Nassarius pictus (Dunker, 1846)
 † Nassarius plainei Van Dingenen, Ceulemans, Landau & C. M. Silva, 2015 
 Nassarius plebejus (Thiele, 1925)
 † Nassarius podolicus (Hoernes & Auinger, 1882) 
 † Nassarius poelsensis (Hilber, 1879) 
 Nassarius polistes (Dall, 1917)
 † Nassarius pontisnovi Cox, 1936 
 Nassarius poppei Thach, 2018
 † Nassarius poteriensis Van Dingenen, Ceulemans, Landau & C. M. Silva, 2015 
 Nassarius poupini Cernohorsky, 1992
  † Nassarius praeambiguus (Brown & Pilsbry, 1913)
 Nassarius praematuratus Kuroda & Habe, 1852
 Nassarius prianganensis Altena & Beets, 1945
 Nassarius protrusidens (Melvill, 1918)
 Nassarius provulgatus (P. Fischer, 1891)
 † Nassarius prysmaticus (Brocchi, 1814)
 Nassarius pseudoconcinnus (E.A. Smith, 1895)
 † Nassarius pseudodemissus Nomura & Zimbo, 1935 
 † Nassarius pseudoovum Harzhauser, Raven & Landau, 2018 
 Nassarius pseudopoecilostictus Adam & Knudsen, 1984
 † Nassarius pseudoserratus Adam & Glibert, 1976 
 † Nassarius pseudoserrulus Landau, Harzhauser, İslamoğlu & Silva, 2013 
 Nassarius psila (Watson, 1882)
 Nassarius pullus (Linnaeus, 1758)
 Nassarius pulvinaris (von Martens, 1881)
 Nassarius pumilio (E.A. Smith, 1872)
 Nassarius punctatus (A. Adams, 1852)
 † Nassarius pupaeformis (Hoernes & Auinger, 1882) 
 Nassarius pupinoides (Reeve, 1853)
 Nassarius pyramidalis A. Adams, 1853
 † Nassarius pyrenaicus (Fontannes, 1879) 
 Nassarius pyrrhus (Menke, 1843)
 Nassarius quadrasi (Hidalgo, 1904)
 Nassarius quantulus (Gould, 1860)
 Nassarius quercinus (Marrat, 1880)
 Nassarius radians Kool & Galindo, 2014
 Nassarius rainbowae Gili, 2015
 † Nassarius rectus (Dollfus & Dautzenberg, 1886) 
 † Nassarius reductus Vermeij & Wesselingh, 2002 
 Nassarius reeveanus (Dunker, 1847)
 Nassarius rehderi Cernohorsky, 1980
 † Nassarius reticosus (J. Sowerby, 1815) 
 Nassarius reunionensis Cernohorsky, 1988
 † Nassarius reussi (K. Martin, 1880)
 Nassarius rhinetes S.S. Berry, 1953 - California nassa
 Nassarius richeri Cernohorsky, 1992
 Nassarius roissyi (Deshayes in Belanger, 1832)
 Nassarius roseae T. Cossignani, 2017
 † Nassarius rubusindicus Oostingh, 1939
 Nassarius rufus (Dunker, 1847)
 † Nassarius salbriacensis (Peyrot, 1925) 
 Nassarius samiae Kool, 2006
 Nassarius sanctaehelenae (A. Adams, 1852)
 Nassarius scabriusculus (Powys, 1835)
 Nassarius scalaris (A. Adams, 1852)
 † Nassarius schroeckingeri (Hoernes & Auinger, 1882) 
 † Nassarius schultzi Harzhauser & Kowalke, 2004 
 Nassarius scissuratus (Dall, 1889) - carved nassa
 Nassarius seclusus (P. Fischer, 1891)
 † Nassarius semistriatus (Brocchi, 1814)
 Nassarius semisulcatus (Rousseau, 1854)
 † Nassarius separabilis Laws, 1939 
 Nassarius sesarmus (Marrat, 1877)
 Nassarius shacklefordi (Melvill & Standen, 1896)
 Nassarius shaskyi Mclean, 1970
 † Nassarius signatodentis Harzhauser & Cernohorsky, 2011 
 Nassarius signatus (Dunker, 1847)
 Nassarius simizui Otuka, 1934
 Nassarius sinarum (Philippi, 1851)
 Nassarius sinusigerus (A. Adams, 1852)
 Nassarius siquijorensis (A. Adams, 1852)
 Nassarius smithii (Marrat, 1877)
 † Nassarius socialis (Hutton, 1886) 
 † Nassarius solidus (Bell, 1898) 
 Nassarius sordidus (A. Adams, 1852)
 Nassarius speciosus (Adams, A., 1852)
 † Nassarius spectabilis (Nyst, 1843) 
 † Nassarius sperlingensis Adam & Glibert, 1976 
 Nassarius spiraliscabrus (Chapman & Gabriel, 1914)
 Nassarius spiratus (A. Adams, 1852)
 Nassarius splendidulus (Dunker, 1846)
 Nassarius stigmarius (A. Adams, 1852)
 Nassarius stimpsonianus (C.B. Adams, 1852)
 Nassarius stolatus (Gmelin, 1791)
 † Nassarius striatulus (Eichwald, 1829)
 Nassarius striatus (C.B. Adams, 1852)
 Nassarius strongae Thach, 2018
 † Nassarius sturi (Hoernes & Auinger, 1882) 
 † Nassarius styriacus (Hilber, 1879) 
 † Nassarius subasperatus (Boettger, 1906) 
 Nassarius subbalteatus MacNeil, 1961
 Nassarius subconstrictus (Sowerby, 1899)
 Nassarius subcopiosus (Ludbrook, 1958)
 Nassarius sublirellus (Tate, 1888)
 † Nassarius subprismaticus (Hoernes & Auinger, 1882) 
 Nassarius subspinosus Lamarck
 Nassarius subtranslucidus (Smith, 1903)
 Nassarius succinctus (A. Adams, 1852)
 Nassarius sufflatus (Gould, 1860)
 Nassarius sumatranus (Thiele, 1925)
 † Nassarius sundaicus Oostingh, 1939
 † Nassarius supernecostatus (Hoernes & Auinger, 1882) 
 Nassarius swearingeni Petuch & R. F. Myers, 2014
 Nassarius tabescens (Marrat, 1880)
 Nassarius tadjallii Moolenbeek, 2007
 Nassarius taeniolatus (Philippi, 1845)
 † Nassarius talahabensis (K. Martin, 1921)
 † Nassarius tambacanus (K. Martin, 1884)
 Nassarius tangaroai Kool, 2006
 Nassarius tango Scarabino, 2004
 † Nassarius tatei (Tenison Woods, 1879) 
 Nassarius tateyamensis Kuroda, 1929
 † Nassarius taurinospeciosus Harzhauser & Cernohorsky, 2011 
 Nassarius teretiusculus (A. Adams, 1852)
 Nassarius thachi Dekker, 2004
 Nassarius thachorum Dekker, Kool & van Gemert, 2016
 Nassarius thaumasius (Sturany, 1900)
 † Nassarius toulai (Hilber, 1879) 
 Nassarius townsendi (Dall, 1880)
 Nassarius trinodosus (E. A. Smith, 1876)
 Nassarius tritoniformis (Kiener, 1841)
 Nassarius troendleorum Cernohorsky, 1980
 † Nassarius tunetoyensis Nomura & Hatai, 1936
 Nassarius turbineus (Gould, 1845)
 † Nassarius turgens (Bellardi, 1882) 
 † Nassarius turonensis (Deshayes, 1844) 
 † Nassarius turpis Van Dingenen, Ceulemans, Landau & C. M. Silva, 2015 
 † Nassarius vandervlerki Oostingh, 1939
 † Nassarius vanesi Oostingh, 1935
 Nassarius vanessae Bozzetti, 2014
 Nassarius vangemerti Moolenbeek, 2010
 Nassarius vanpeli Kool, 2005
 Nassarius vanuatuensis Kool & Galindo, 2014
 Nassarius variciferus (A. Adams, 1852)
 † Nassarius varicosecostatus (Fischer in Wanner, 1927)
 Nassarius velatus (Gould, 1850)
 Nassarius velvetosus Kool & Galindo, 2014
 † Nassarius venemai (Koperberg, 1931)
 Nassarius venustus (Dunker, 1847)
 Nassarius vidalensis (Barnard, 1959)
 Nassarius vinctus (Marrat, 1877)
 Nassarius vitiensis (Hombron & Jacquinot, 1848)
 Nassarius vittatus (A. Adams, 1853)
 † Nassarius volhynicus (Andrzejowski, 1830) 
 † Nassarius vulgatissimus (Mayer, 1860) 
 Nassarius webbei (Petit, 1850)
 Nassarius websteri Petuch & Sargent, 2012
 Nassarius whiteheadae Cernohorsky, 1984
 Nassarius wilsoni (C.B. Adams, 1852)
 Nassarius wolffi Knudsen
 † Nassarius zborzewskii (Andrzejowski, 1830)

Synonyms
 Nassarius angulicostis (Pilsbry and Lowe, 1932): synonym of Nassarius nodicinctus (A. Adams, 1852)
 Nassarius antillarum (d’Orbigny, 1847) - Antilles nassa: synonym of Phrontis antillara (d'Orbigny, 1847)
 Nassarius antiquatus (Watson, 1897): synonym of Nassarius recidivus (Martens, 1876)
 Nassarius balteatus (Pease, 1869): synonym of Reticunassa balteata (Pease, 1869)
 Nassarius brychius (Watson, 1822): synonym of Nassarius frigens (E. von Martens, 1878): synonym of Tritia frigens (E. von Martens, 1878)
 Nassarius burchardi (Dunker in Philippi, 1849): synonym of Tritia burchardi (Philippi, 1849)
  Nassarius caboverdensis (Rolán, 1984): synonym of Tritia caboverdensis (Rolán, 1984)
 † Nassarius cabrierensis (Fontannes, 1878): synonym of † Nassarius striatulus (Eichwald, 1829)
 Nassarius candidissimus (C. B. Adams, 1845): synonym of Phrontis candidissima (C. B. Adams, 1845)
 Nassarius cockburnensis Kool & Dekker, 2006: synonym of Reticunassa cockburnensis (Kool & Dekker, 2006) (original combination)
 Nassarius compactus (Angas, 1865): synonym of Reticunassa compacta (Angas, 1865)
 Nassarius complanatus (Powys, 1835): synonym of Phrontis complanata (Powys, 1835)
 Nassarius conspersus (Philippi, 1848): synonym of Tritia conspersa (Philippi, 1849)
 Nassarius coralligenus (Pallary, 1900): synonym of Tritia coralligena (Pallary, 1900)
 Nassarius corniculum (Olivi, 1792): synonym of Tritia corniculum (Olivi, 1792)
 Nassarius corpulentus (C.B. Adams, 1852): synonym of Nassarius nassiformis (Lesson, 1842): synonym of Phrontis nassiformis (Lesson, 1842)
 Nassarius costellifera A. Adams: synonym of Nassarius margaritifer (Dunker, 1847)
 Nassarius crenulicostatus (Shuto, 1969): synonym of Reticunassa crenulicostata (Shuto, 1969)
 Nassarius crossei (Maltzan, 1884): synonym of Nassarius dakarensis (Fischer-Piette & Nicklès, 1946)
 Nassarius cussottii Bozzetti, 2006: synonym of Nassarius irus (Martens, 1880)
 Nassarius cuvierii (Payraudeau, 1826): synonym of Tritia cuvierii (Payraudeau, 1826)
 Nassarius denticulatus (A. Adams, 1852): synonym of Tritia denticulata (A. Adams, 1852)
 Nassarius elegans Kiener, 1834: synonym of Nassarius crassiusculus (Nyst, 1845)
 Nassarius elatus (Gould, 1845): synonym of Tritia elata (Gould, 1845)
 Nassarius ephamillus (Watson, 1882): synonym of Tritia ephamilla (Watson, 1882)
 Nassarius erythraeus (Issel, 1869): synonym of Reticunassa erythraea (Issel, 1869)
 Nassarius festivus (Powys, 1835): synonym of Reticunassa festiva (Powys, 1835)
 Nassarius fischeri Dautzenberg: synonym of Nassarius fuscescens (Dautzenberg, 1912)
 Nassarius frigens (Martens, 1878): synonym of Tritia frigens (Martens, 1878)
 Nassarius gemmulatus (Lamarck, 1822): synonym of Nassarius conoidalis (Deshayes in Belanger, 1832)
 Nassarius gibbosulus (Linnaeus, 1758): synonym of Tritia gibbosula (Linnaeus, 1758)
 Nassarius glabratus (G.B. Sowerby II, 1842): synonym of Naytia glabrata (G. B. Sowerby II, 1842)
 Nassarius goreensis (Von Maltzan, 1884): synonym of Tritia goreensis (Maltzan, 1884)
 Nassarius graniferus Kiener, 1834: synonym of Nassarius granifer Kiener, 1834
 Nassarius granuliferus (Kiener, 1834): synonym of Nassarius granifer Kiener, 1834
 Nassarius granum (Lamarck, 1822): synonym of Tritia grana (Lamarck, 1822)
 Nassarius hanraveni Kool & Dekker, 2006: synonym of Reticunassa hanraveni (Kool & Dekker, 2006)
 Nassarius heynemanni (Von Maltzan, 1884): synonym of Tritia heynemanni (Maltzan, 1884)
 Nassarius hotessieri (d'Orbigny, 1843): synonym of Phrontis hotessieriana (d'Orbigny, 1842)
 Nassarius hotessierianus (d'Orbigny, 1842) - miniature nassa: synonym of Phrontis hotessieriana (d'Orbigny, 1842)
 Nassarius incrassatus (Stroem, 1768): synonym of Tritia incrassata (Strøm, 1768)
 Nassarius insignis (H. Adams, 1867): synonym of Nassodonta insignis H. Adams, 1867
 Nassarius jeanmartini Kool & Dekker, 2006: synonym of Reticunassa jeanmartini (Kool & Dekker, 2006)
 Nassarius johni (Monterosato, 1889): synonym of Naytia johni (Monterosato, 1889)
 Nassarius karinae (Usticke, 1971): synonym of Phrontis karinae (Nowell-Usticke, 1971)
 Nassarius kieneri (Deshayes, 1863): synonym of Nassarius bourbonensis Kool, 2015
 Nassarius lima (Dillwyn, 1817): synonym of Tritia lima (Dillwyn, 1817)
 Nassarius louisi (Pallary, 1912): synonym of Tritia louisi (Pallary, 1912)
 Nassarius luteostoma (Broderip & Sowerby, 1829): synonym of Phrontis luteostoma (Broderip & G. B. Sowerby I, 1829)
 Nassarius margaritifera (Dunker, 1847): synonym of Nassarius margaritifer
 Nassarius margaritiferus (Dunker, 1847à: synonym of Nassarius margaritifer
 Nassarius melanioides (Reeve, 1853): synonym of  Nassarius fuscus (Hombron & Jacquinot, 1848)
 Nassarius miga (Bruguière, 1789): synonym of Tritia miga (Bruguière, 1789)
 Nassarius monilis (Kiener, 1834): synonym of Nassarius distortus (A. Adams, 1852)
 Nassarius mucronata: synonym of Nassarius gaudiosus (Hinds, 1844)
 Nassarius mutabilis (Linnaeus, 1758): synonym of Tritia mutabilis (Linnaeus, 1758)
 Nassarius nanus Nowell-Usticke, G.W., 1959: synonym of Nassarius karinae Nowell-Usticke, G.W., 1971,  synonym of Phrontis karinae (Nowell-Usticke, 1971)
 Nassarius nigrolabra (Verrill, 1880): synonym of Nassarius nigrolabrus (Verrill, 1880)
 Nassarius nitidus (Jeffreys, 1867): synonym of Tritia nitida (Jeffreys, 1867)
 Nassarius nodifer (Powys, 1835): synonym of Nassarius nodiferus (Powys, 1835)
 Nassarius obliquus Kiener: synonym of Nassarius glabratus (G.B. Sowerby II, 1842), synonym of Naytia glabrata (G. B. Sowerby II, 1842)
 Nassarius obsoletus (Say, 1822) - eastern mudsnail: synonym of Ilyanassa obsoleta (Say, 1822): synonym of Tritia obsoleta (Say, 1822)
 Nassarius ovoideus (Locard, 1886): synonym of Tritia ovoidea (Locard, 1886)
 Nassarius pagodus (Reeve, 1844): synonym of Phrontis pagoda (Reeve, 1844)
 Nassarius pauperus (Gould, 1850): synonym of Reticunassa paupera (Gould, 1850)
 Nassarius perpinguis (Hinds, 1844) - fat western nassa: synonym of Caesia perpinguis (Hinds, 1844)
 Nassarius pfeifferi (Philippi, 1844): synonym of Tritia pfeifferi (Philippi, 1844)
 Nassarius plicatellus Adams: synonym of Nassarius niveus (A. Adams, 1852)
 Nassarius polygonatus (Lamarck, 1822): synonym of Phrontis polygonata (Lamarck, 1822)
 Nassarius priscardi Bozzetti, 2006: synonym of Naytia priscardi (Bozzetti, 2006)
 Nassarius pygmaeus Lamarck, 1822: synonym of Tritia pygmaea (Lamarck, 1822)
 Nassarius recidivus (Martens, 1876): synonym of Tritia recidiva (von Martens, 1876)
 † Nassarius ridibundus Lozouet, 1999: synonym of † Tritia ridibunda (Lozouet, 1999) 
 Nassarius robustus (Monterosato, 1890): synonym of Tritia lima (Dillwyn, 1817)
 Nassarius rotundus (Melvill & Standen, 1896): synonym of Reticunassa rotunda (Melvill & Standen, 1896)
 Nassarius semiplicatoides Zhang, Ai-Ju, You, Zhong-Jie, 2007: synonym of Nassarius foveolatus (Dunker, 1847)
 Nassarius sertulus (A. Adams, 1852 in 1852-53): synonym of Nassarius haldemani (Dunker, 1847)
 † Nassarius signatus (Hörnes, 1852): synonym of † Nassarius signatodentis Harzhauser & Cernohorsky, 2011 
 Nassarius silvardi Kool & Dekker, 2006: synonym of Reticunassa silvardi (Kool & Dekker, 2006)
 Nassarius simoni Kool & Dekker, 2007: synonym of Reticunassa simoni (Kool & Dekker, 2007)
 Nassarius simplex (E.A. Smith, 1880): synonym of Nassarius tango F. Scarabino, 2004
 Nassarius skoogi (Odhner, 1923): synonym of Adinassa skoogi (Odhner, 1923)
 Nassarius smitsorum Kool, 1990: synonym of Nassarius quercinus (Marrat, 1880)
 † Nassarius subincognitus Lozouet, 1999: synonym of † Tritia subincognita (Lozouet, 1999) 
 Nassarius suturalis(Lamarck, 1822): synonym of Nassarius glans (Linnaeus, 1758)
 Nassarius taenius (Gmelin, 1790): synonym of Nassarius olivaceus (Bruguière, 1789)
 Nassarius tiarula (Kiener, 1841) - western mud nassa: synonym of Phrontis tiarula (Kiener, 1841)
 Nassarius tinei (Maravigna in Guérin, 1840): synonym of Tritia tinei (Maravigna, 1840)
 Nassarius tingitanus (Pallary, 1901): synonym of Tritia tingitana (Pallary, 1901)
 Nassarius trifasciatus Adams: synonym of Nassarius vinctus (Marrat, 1877)
 Nassarius trivittatus (Say, 1822) - threeline mudsnail: synonym of Tritia trivittata (Say, 1822), synonym of Ilyanassa trivittata (Say, 1822)
 Nassarius turulosus (Risso, 1826): synonym of Tritia turulosa (Risso, 1826)
 Nassarius unicolor Kiener, L.C., 1834: synonym of Nassarius dorsatus  (Röding, 1798)
 Nassarius unifasciatus (Kiener, 1834): synonym of Tritia unifasciata (Kiener, 1834)
 Nassarius versicolor (C. B. Adams, 1852): synonym of Phrontis versicolor (C. B. Adams, 1852)
 Nassarius vibex (Say, 1822) - bruised nassa: synonym of Phrontis vibex (Say, 1822)
 Nassarius weyersi Craven: synonym of Nassarius pumilio (E.A. Smith, 1872)
 Nassarius vaucheri (Pallary, 1906): synonym of Tritia vaucheri (Pallary, 1906)
 Nassarius zanzibarensis Kool & Dekker, 2007: synonym of Reticunassa zanzibarensis (Kool & Dekker, 2007)
 Nassarius zonalis (A. Adams, 1852): synonym of Nassarius reeveanus (Dunker, 1847)

Synonymized subgenera 
 Nassarius (Aciculina) Adams, 1853   (alternate representation of Nassarius Duméril, 1805
 Nassarius (Alectryon) Berthold in Latreille, 1827: synonym of Nassarius (Alectrion) Montfort, 1810 (alternate representation of Nassarius Duméril, 1805)
 Nassarius (Allanassa) Iredale, 1929: synonym of Nassarius Duméril, 1805
 Nassarius (Amycla) H. Adams & A. Adams, 1853: synonym of Nassarius (Gussonea) Monterosato, 1912
 Nassarius (Amyclina) Iredale, 1918: synonym of Nassarius (Gussonea) Monterosato, 1912
 Nassarius (Arcularia) Link, 1807: alternate representation of Nassarius Duméril, 1805
 Nassarius (Arcularia) glabratus (Sowerby, 1842): synonym of Nassarius glabratus (Sowerby, 1842)
 Nassarius (Austronassaria) C. Laseron & J. Laseron, 1956: synonym of Nassarius (Plicarcularia) Thiele, 1929 (alternate representation of Nassarius Duméril, 1805)
 Nassarius (Bathynassa) Ladd, 1976: synonym of Nassarius (Zeuxis) H. Adams & A. Adams, 1853 (alternate representation of Nassarius Duméril, 1805)
 Nassarius (Caesia) H. Adams & A. Adams, 1853: alternate representation of Nassarius Duméril, 1805
  Nassarius (Cencus) Gistel, 1848: synonym of Nassarius (Cyclope) Risso, 1826 (alternate representation of Nassarius Duméril, 1805)
 Nassarius (Chelenassa) Shuto, 1969: synonym of  Nassarius (Plicarcularia) Thiele, 1929 (alternate representation of Nassarius Duméril, 1805)
 Nassarius (Cryptonassarius) Watson, R.B., 1882: alternate representation of Nassarius Duméril, 1805
 Nassarius (Cyclocyrtia) Agassiz, 1848: synonym of Nassarius (Cyclope) Risso, 1826 (alternate representation of Nassarius Duméril, 1805)
 Nassarius (Cyclonassa) Swainson, 1840: synonym of Nassarius (Cyclope) Risso, 1826 (alternate representation of Nassarius Duméril, 1805)
 Nassarius (Cyclope) Risso, 1826: alternate representation of Nassarius Duméril, 1805
 Nassarius (Cyclops) Montfort, 1810: synonym of Nassarius (Cyclope) Risso, 1826 (alternate representation of Nassarius Duméril, 1805)
 Nassarius (Demondia) Addicott, 1956: synonym of Nassarius (Caesia) H. Adams & A. Adams, 1853 (alternate representation of Nassarius Duméril, 1805)
 Nassarius (Eione) Risso, 1826: synonym of Nassarius (Plicarcularia) Thiele, 1929 (alternate representation of Nassarius Duméril, 1805)
 Nassarius (Fackia) Nordsieck, 1972: synonym of Nassarius (Gussonea) Monterosato, 1912
 Nassarius (Glabrinassa) Shuto, 1969: synonym of Nassarius (Zeuxis) H. Adams & A. Adams, 1853 (alternate representation of Nassarius Duméril, 1805)
 Nassarius (Gussonea) Monterosato, 1912: synonym of Nassarius Duméril, 1805
 Nassarius (Hannonia) Pallary, 1914: synonym of Nassarius (Aciculina) Adams, 1853 (alternate representation of Nassarius Duméril, 1805)
 Nassarius (Hima) Gray, 1852 ex Leach, ms.: alternate representation of Nassarius Duméril, 1805
 Nassarius (Hinia) Gray, 1847: alternate representation of Nassarius Duméril, 1805
 Nassarius (Miohinia) Nordsieck, 1972: synonym of Nassarius (Hinia) Gray, 1847 (alternate representation of Nassarius Duméril, 1805)
 Nassarius (Mirua) Marwick, 1931: synonym of Nassarius (Hima) Gray, 1852 ex Leach, ms. (alternate representation of Nassarius Duméril, 1805)
 Nassarius (Nana) Schumacher, 1817: synonym of Nassarius (Cyclope) Risso, 1826 (alternate representation of Nassarius Duméril, 1805)
 Nassarius (Nanina) Risso, 1826: synonym of Nassarius (Cyclope) Risso, 1826 (alternate representation of Nassarius Duméril, 1805)
 Nassarius (Nanarius) Woodring, 1964: alternate representation of Nassarius Duméril, 1805
 Nassarius (Nannia) Philippi, 1844: synonym of Nassarius (Cyclope) Risso, 1826 (alternate representation of Nassarius Duméril, 1805)
 Nassarius (Nasseburna) de Gregorio, 1890: synonym of Nassarius (Sphaeronassa) Locard, 1886 (alternate representation of Nassarius Duméril, 1805)
 Nassarius (Nassodonta) H. Adams, 1867: alternate representation of Nassarius Duméril, 1805
 Nassarius (Nassarius) Duméril, 1805: alternate representation of Nassarius Duméril, 1805
 Nassarius (Naytia) H. Adams & A. Adams 1853: alternate representation of Nassarius Duméril, 1805
  Nassarius (Naytiopsis) Thiele, 1929: alternate representation of Nassarius Duméril, 1805
 Nassarius (Neritula) Herrmannsen, 1852: synonym of Nassarius (Cyclope) Risso, 1826 (alternate representation of Nassarius Duméril, 1805)
 Nassarius (Niotha) H. Adams & A. Adams, 1853:  alternate representation of Nassarius Duméril, 1805
 Nassarius (Pallacera) Woodring, 1964:  alternate representation of Nassarius Duméril, 1805
 Nassarius (Phrontis) H. Adams & A. Adams, 1853:  alternate representation of Nassarius Duméril, 1805
 Nassarius (Panormella) Costa, 1840: synonym of Nassarius (Cyclope) Risso, 1826 (alternate representation of Nassarius Duméril, 1805)
 Nassarius (Paranassa) Conrad, 1867: synonym of Nassarius (Ilyanassa) Stimpson, 1865 (alternate representation of Nassarius Duméril, 1805)
 Nassarius (Parcanassa) Iredale, 1936: synonym of Nassarius (Plicarcularia) Thiele, 1929 (alternate representation of Nassarius Duméril, 1805)
  Nassarius (Plicarcularia) Thiele, 1929: alternate representation of Nassarius Duméril, 1805
 Nassarius (Profundinassa) Thiele, 1929: alternate representation of Nassarius Duméril, 1805
 Nassarius (Proneritula) Thiele, 1929: alternate representation of Nassarius Duméril, 1805
 Nassarius (Psilarius) Woodring, 1964: alternate representation of Nassarius Duméril, 1805
 Nassarius (Pygmaeonassa) Annadale, 1924: alternate representation of Nassarius Duméril, 1805
 Nassarius (Retiarcularia) Shuto, 1969: synonym of Nassarius (Plicarcularia) Thiele, 1929 (alternate representation of Nassarius Duméril, 1805)
 Nassarius (Reticunassa) Iredale, 1936: synonym of Nassarius (Hima) Gray, 1852 ex Leach, ms. alternate representation of Nassarius Duméril, 1805)
 Nassarius (Schizopyga) Conrad, 1856: synonym of Nassarius (Caesia) H. Adams & A. Adams, 1853 (alternate representation of Nassarius Duméril, 1805)
 Nassarius (Sphaeronassa) Locard, 1886: alternate representation of Nassarius Duméril, 1805
 Nassarius (Tarazeuxis) Iredale, 1936: synonym of Nassarius (Telasco) H. Adams & A. Adams, 1853 (alternate representation of Nassarius Duméril, 1805)
 Nassarius (Tavanothia) Iredale, 1936: synonym of Nassarius (Niotha) H. Adams & A. Adams, 1853 (alternate representation of Nassarius Duméril, 1805)
 Nassarius (Telasco) H. Adams & A. Adams, 1853: alternate representation of Nassarius Duméril, 1805
 Nassarius (Tritia) A. Adams, 1853: synonym of Nassarius (Hinia) Gray, 1847  (alternate representation of Nassarius Duméril, 1805)
 Nassarius (Tritonella) A. Adams, 1852: synonym of Nassarius (Hima) Gray, 1852 ex Leach, ms.  (alternate representation of Nassarius Duméril, 1805)
 Nassarius (Usita) Noszky, 1936: synonym of Nassarius (Uzita) H. Adams & A. Adams, 1853 (alternate representation of Nassarius Duméril, 1805)
 Nassarius (Uzita) H. Adams & A. Adams, 1853: alternate representation of Nassarius Duméril, 1805
 Nassarius (Venassa) Martens, 1881: synonym of Nassarius (Zeuxis) H. Adams & A. Adams, 1853 (alternate representation of Nassarius Duméril, 1805)
 Nassarius (Varicinassa) Habe, 1946: alternate representation of Nassarius Duméril, 1805
 Nassarius (Zaphon) H. Adams & A. Adams, 1853: synonym of Nassarius (Caesia) H. Adams & A. Adams, 1853 (alternate representation of Nassarius Duméril, 1805)
 Nassarius (Zeuxis) H. Adams & A. Adams, 1853: alternate representation of Nassarius Duméril, 1805

References

Further reading
 
 Bernard, P.A. (Ed.) (1984). Coquillages du Gabon [Shells of Gabon]. Pierre A. Bernard: Libreville, Gabon. 140, 75 plates pp

External links
 Malacos: a more complete list
  Locard A. (1886). Prodrome de malacologie française. Catalogue général des mollusques vivants de France. Mollusque marins. Lyon, H. Georg & Paris, Baillière: pp. X + 778

Nassariidae
Taxa named by André Marie Constant Duméril
Gastropod genera